The NHS Health Check is a preventive healthcare programme offered by Public Health England. The programme invites adults aged between 40 and 74 in England for a health check-up every five years to screen for key conditions including heart disease, diabetes, kidney disease, and stroke. Local authorities are responsible for the commissioning of the programme, with GPs being the most common provider, followed by community outreach and pharmacy providers.

Creation and criticism 
In January 2008, UK Prime Minister Gordon Brown announced that preventive healthcare was planned to be offered throughout England to "monitor for heart disease, strokes, diabetes and kidney disease–conditions which affect the lives of 6.2 million people, cause 200,000 deaths each year and account for a fifth of all hospital admissions."

Some, such as the Glasgow GP Margaret McCartney, have criticised the programme of health checks as being without evidence of effectiveness. However, the head of health and wellbeing at Public Health England Kevin Fenton defended the programme, claiming it was evidence-based.

A study published in 2014 in the British Journal of General Practice found no significant differences in the change to the prevalence of diabetes, hypertension, heart disease, chronic kidney disease or atrial fibrillation in general practices providing NHS Health Checks compared with control practices.

Costs and take-up 
Peter Walsh, deputy director of the Strategy Group at NHS England admitted that take-up of the checks was poor in January 2016, after a study showed that  20% of those eligible aged 60–74 attended and 9.0% of those between 40 and 59.

In May 2016 researchers from Imperial College London concluded that the checkup reduced the 10-year risk of cardiovascular disease by 0.21%, equivalent to one stroke or heart attack avoided every year for 4,762 people who attend. The programme cost £165 million a year.

A retrospective observational study by the Centre for Primary Care and Public Health, Queen Mary University of London found that take up in an ethnically diverse and socially deprived area of East London had increased from 7.3% of eligible patients in 2009 to 85.0% in 2013–2014.  New diagnoses of diabetes were 30% more likely in attendees than nonattendees, hypertension 50%, and Chronic Kidney Disease 80%.

In August 2019, Matt Hancock announced that the checks would be more tailored to individuals’ risks.

In the five years from 2016 to 2021, the average uptake of an NHS Health Check following an invite was 46.5%. In the same period, there were stark inequalities in uptake between the regions of England, particularly in areas of London, the North West, and the West Midlands.

Elsewhere in the UK

Scotland 
In Scotland, the Keep Well programme was introduced in October 2006 to screen for cardiovascular diseases and associated risk factors, with a focus on reducing health inequalities. Those over 40 years old were invited for a Keep Well check at least every five years. The programme operated in several waves, each with updated requirements and specifications, and its effectiveness was judged to be mixed. In December 2013, the Scottish Chief Medical Officer announced the Government would discontinue funding for the Keep Well programme. The programme subsequently ended in March 2017.

See also
NHS in England

References

External links
 NHS Health Check
 The Local Authorities (Public Health Functions and Entry to Premises by Local Healthwatch Representatives) Regulations 2013

National Health Service (England)
Preventive medicine